My Golden Life is a 2017-18 South Korean television series starring Park Si-hoo, Shin Hye-sun, Lee Tae-hwan, and Seo Eun-soo. The series was originally broadcast on KBS2 every Saturday and Sunday from September 2017 to March 2018 between 19:55 to 21:15 (KST).

Synopsis
Revolves around a woman who has a chance to rise in status but falls into a bottomless pit, and eventually finds a chance to seek happiness. It also involves a man who tries to find happiness in her.

A mother's misguided love has caused her daughters to get swapped in status, and so the heroine Seo Ji-an enters the chaebol household to have a better life without knowing she is actually not their long-lost daughter, Choi Eun-Seok, but her "former twin" sister Seo Ji-soo instead. When the secret eventually gets revealed, Seo Ji-an turns miserable and attempts suicide. Eventually, Seo Ji-an's friend rescued her and brings her back to life. What way would Seo Ji-an use to seek happiness for herself, and what will happen to her relationship with the son of chaebol family Choi Do-kyung, whom she has gotten closer to as siblings?

Cast

Main
 Park Si-hoo as Choi Do-kyung
He is the only heir to Haeseong Group and the head of Strategic Planning Team. He is a third generation chaebol who has returned from the US after finishing his MBA. He is a gentleman with admirable physique and elegance. He takes pride in the fact that he practices Noblesse Oblige unlike other chaebols who like to power trip. When the "perpetrator" of an accident involving his car, Seo Ji-An, is later revealed to be his younger sister, 'Choi Eunseok,' his life takes a new turn.
 Shin Hye-sun as Seo Ji-an
She is on a probationary two-year contract with the marketing team of Haeseong Group. Before her father went bankrupt 10 years ago, she used to be the original 'girl crush.' Everyone admires her competitive spirit and cheerful personality. Now she only dreams of being a full-time employee of the Haeseong Group. When that dream is shattered by a friend with wealth and connections, she hits rock bottom. Then, like a miracle, she gets a chance to reverse her life as the daughter of Haeseong Group, Choi Eun-seok. She chooses to take the silver spoon and live a glamorous life. But unexpected challenges are waiting for her.
 Lee Tae-hwan as Sunwoo Hyuk
He is Ji-An's high school friend. With a major in interior design, he runs a DIY furniture shopping mall. He has a cheerful and feisty personality, but he also has a cranky side and his likes and dislike are very clear. Ever since he fell in love with Ji-An at first sight in high school, he has had a crush on her. He does not realize that Ji-Soo, who has a crush on him, is Ji-An's twin sister.
 Seo Eun-soo as Seo Ji-Soo
Ji-An's twin sister; After graduating from vocational college, she has been making a living as a part-timer for years. She is without a worry in the world. Since she loves bread so much, she gets a job at a local bakery. Without knowing the relationship between Ji-An and Hyuk, she has a secret crush on Hyuk. When her twin sister enters the chaebol family, she learns the secret behind her birth and becomes confused as she is the real Choi Eun-seok.

Supporting

Seo Ji-an's family
 Chun Ho-jin as Seo Tae-soo, the twins' father
Tae-Soo has been the breadwinner for his family for his entire life. He previously had a successful life as a self-made businessman, but after going bankrupt some years earlier, he has been working as a day laborer but struggles with discrimination due to his older age and his wife being vocal of her shame at his plight.
 Kim Hye-ok as Yang Mi-jung, the twins' mother
She thought she would live as a housewife without ever having to get her hands dirty. Her pride is battered with her husband Tae-Soo's bankruptcy. Reality makes her a pessimist and her negative attitude and constant complaining often annoy her family. She prays that her daughter Ji-an, who enters a chaebol family, does not end up like her.
 Lee Tae-sung as Seo Ji-tae, the twins' older brother
Ji-tae is the eldest of Tae-soo's four children. Having graduated from university abroad, he is the envy of his younger siblings as he has a full-time job and a steady girlfriend. Burdened with having to help pay off his father's debt, he hides his own struggles from his family and will do anything for them, including sacrificing his own happiness. 
 Shin Hyun-soo as Seo Ji-ho, the twins' younger brother
Ji-ho is the youngest of Tae-soo's four children. At the beginning of the series he was a high school student preparing for the college entrance exam and worked part-time to save up for his college tuition. Cheerful and happy-go-lucky by nature, he is doted on by his family and is fiercely protective of his siblings.

Choi Do-Kyung's family
 Jeon No-min as Choi Jae-sung, Do-kyung's father. He and Myung-hee were university sweethearts and he married her even after finding out about her background as a chaebol heiress. Although he works for his in-laws' company, he feels suffocated and despises the cold mannerisms and lack of personal relationships between his in-laws.
 Na Young-hee as Noh Myung-hee, mother of Do-kyung & Seo-hyun and elder daughter of Noh Yang-ho. She is portrayed in the story unsympathetically as a rather self-centered lady, possibly because of her upbringing and manipulation of her overbearing father. She tends to be uncaring towards others, especially people of inferior wealth and influence in comparison with her.
 Lee Da-in as Choi Seo-hyun, Do-kyung's younger sister. Although appearing to be a typical "golden child", she hides a more rebellious side of her from her brother and parents and wishes to explore the world outside of her family's bubble of wealthy friends and connections. She feels left out when her parents, especially the mother, fuss so much over the return of her missing sister.
 Shin Hye-sun/Seo Eun-soo as Choi Eun-seok, long lost daughter of Haesung Group. Seo Ji-an enters the Haesung Group Chaebol family as Choi Eun-seok. But later it is revealed that Seo Ji-soo, fraternal twin of Ji-an may be the actual Choi Eun-seok.

Haesung Group
 Kim Byung-ki as Noh Yang-ho, the family patriarch and former chairman of Haesung Group 
 Jeon Soo-kyung as Noh Jin-hee, Noh Yang-ho's younger daughter
 Yoo Ha-bok as Jung Myung-soo, Noh Jin-Hee's husband
 Seo Kyung-hwa as Min Deul-lae, Choi family's household manager
 Wi Ha-joon as Ryu Jae-shin, Choi Seo-Hyun's former driver

Extended

 Jung So-young as Sunwoo Hee , Sunwoo Hyuk's elder sister
 Choi Gwi-hwa as Kang Nam-goo, Seo Ji-Soo's boss
 Kwon Hyuk-poong as Sunwoo Seok, Sunwoo Hyuk & Hee's father
 Park Joo-hee as Lee Soo-ah, Seo Ji-tae's longtime lover and then wife
 Lee Jong-nam as Shin Hae-ja, Yang Mi-jung's friend
 Lee Gyu-bok as Yoo secretary
 Kim Sung-hoon as Lee Yong-kook
 Baek Seo-yi as Yoon Ha-Jung, Seo Ji-An's frenemy
 Kim Sa-kwan as Kim Ki-jae
 Shin Min-kyung as departmental student representative
 Yoo In-young as Jang So-ra, Choi Do-Kyung's fiancée.
 Gong Min-jeung as Song Mi-heon

Original soundtrack

Reception
The drama became one of the fastest-growing in ratings among KBS2 TV series in the same timeslot, starting with 19.7% for the first episode and surpassing 30% mark (30.9%) in 8 episodes. It went on to become the fastest to reach the National Drama level of 40% rating (41.2% in 30 episodes) among KBS2 TV series in the same timeslot.

The drama was praised as an atypical family drama, avoiding cliches such as family conflicts and typical "Cinderella stories" with "happily-ever-after" endings, instead focusing on pursuing personal happiness based on one's own decision. There was more thorough characterization and focus on characters' emotions and personal journeys, which were praised by viewers as making the characters much more relatable. The series has been noted for highlighting current social issues in South Korean society, such as the breaking down of the traditional family unit in more recent times, discrimination against older and lower to middle-income workers and the struggles faced by the "N-po" generation.

Because of its popularity, it was also the first KBS2 drama in the same time slot to have a special episode. The 2½-hour program consisted of behind-the-scenes footage, cast and staff interviews, director's cuts of the first 10 episodes. It aired on October 4, 2017, from 3:25 to 6 pm (KST) during the Chuseok national holiday period.

Awards and nominations

Viewership

References

External links
  
 
 

Korean Broadcasting System television dramas
2017 South Korean television series debuts
Korean-language television shows
Television series by Studio Dragon
2018 South Korean television series endings